Leggia is a former municipality in the district of Moesa in the Swiss canton of Graubünden.  On 1 January 2017 the former municipalities of Leggia and Verdabbio merged into the municipality of Grono.

History
Leggia is first mentioned in 1295 as de Legia.

Geography
Of this area, 8.6% is used for agricultural purposes, while 63.9% is forested. Of the rest of the land, 2.7% is settled (buildings or roads) and the remainder (24.7%) is non-productive (rivers, glaciers or mountains).

The former municipality is located in the Roveredo sub-district of the Moesa district on the right bank of the Moesa river.

Demographics
Leggia had a population (as of 2015) of 138.  , 6.7% of the population was made up of foreign nationals.  Over the last 10 years the population has decreased at a rate of -16.8%.  Most of the population speaks Italian (84.3%), with German  being second most common (11.8%) and Spanish being third ( 2.4%).

, the gender distribution of the population was 50.0% male and 50.0% female.  The age distribution, in Leggia is; 13 children or 10.2% of the population are between 0 and 9 years old.  7 teenagers or 5.5% are 10 to 14, and 7 teenagers or 5.5% are 15 to 19.  Of the adult population, 12 people or 9.4% of the population are between 20 and 29 years old.  23 people or 18.1% are 30 to 39, 16 people or 12.6% are 40 to 49, and 15 people or 11.8% are 50 to 59.  The senior population distribution is 17 people or 13.4% of the population are between 60 and 69 years old, 10 people or 7.9% are 70 to 79, there are 5 people or 3.9% who are 80 to 89, and there are 2 people or 1.6% who are 90 to 99.

In the 2007 federal election the most popular party was the SP which received 32.3% of the vote.  The next three most popular parties were the SVP (28.1%), the CVP (21.9%) and the FDP (17.7%).

In Leggia about 55.1% of the population (between age 25-64) have completed either non-mandatory upper secondary education or additional higher education (either university or a Fachhochschule).

Leggia has an unemployment rate of 1.67%.  , there were 19 people employed in the primary economic sector and about 8 businesses involved in this sector.  14 people are employed in the secondary sector and there are 2 businesses in this sector.  2 people are employed in the tertiary sector, with 1 business in this sector.

The historical population is given in the following table:

References

External links
 Official website 
 

Grono
Former municipalities of Graubünden